The Elgin is a Grade II listed public house at 96 Ladbroke Grove, London.

It is on the Campaign for Real Ale's National Inventory of Historic Pub Interiors.

It was built in the mid-19th century, and the architect is not known.

The Elgin was a mod venue in the 1960s and a punk rock one in the 1970s.
  
In May 1975 The 101ers were offered a weekly residency there which led to a nine-month stay.

Notable regular patrons have included the serial killer John Christie and Joe Strummer of The Clash.

References

Grade II listed buildings in the Royal Borough of Kensington and Chelsea
Grade II listed pubs in London
National Inventory Pubs
Pubs in the Royal Borough of Kensington and Chelsea